Minuscule 192 (in the Gregory-Aland numbering), ε 313 (Soden), is a Greek minuscule manuscript of the New Testament, on parchment. Palaeographically it has been assigned to the 13th century. It has complex contents, with full marginalia.

Description 

The codex contains a complete text of the four Gospels on 200 thick parchment leaves (size ). The text is written in one column per page, in 28 lines per page.

There is also another division according to the Ammonian Sections (in Mark 236), with references to the Eusebian Canons (in the same line with the Ammonian Sections).

Text 

The Greek text of the codex is a representative of the Byzantine text-type. Aland placed it in Category V.
According to the Claremont Profile Method it represents the textual family Π171.

History 

The manuscript was examined by Birch, Scholz, and Burgon. C. R. Gregory saw it in 1886.

It is currently housed at the Laurentian Library (Plutei. VI. 30), at Florence.

Notes

See also 

 List of New Testament minuscules
 Biblical manuscript
 Textual criticism

References

Further reading 

 

Greek New Testament minuscules
13th-century biblical manuscripts